Shustov is a Russian masculine surname, its feminine counterpart is Shustova. Notable people with the surname include:

Aleksandr Shustov (born 1984), Russian high jumper 
Nikolay Shustov (1834–1868), Russian painter
Sergey Shustov (born 1930), Soviet Olympic alpine skier

Russian-language surnames